Yeni Sahra Stadium is a football stadium in the Ataşehir district of the city of Istanbul.  The stadium has a capacity of 700 spectators and was built in 2008.

The stadium is currently used for football matches only, and it is the home ground of Ataşehir Belediyespor women's football team.

References

Football venues in Turkey
Sports venues in Istanbul
Buildings and structures in Istanbul
Sports venues completed in 2008
Sport in Ataşehir
2008 establishments in Turkey